Suchiya  is a village in Chanditala I community development block of Srirampore subdivision in Hooghly district in the Indian state of West Bengal.

Geography

Gram panchayat
Villages and census towns in Masat gram panchayat are: Aushbati, Azabnagar, Banamalipur, Chhunche, Krishnanagar and Masat.

Demographics
As per 2011 Census of India, Chhunche had a total population of 2,569 of which 1,228 (48%) were males and 1,341 (52%) were females. Population below 6 years was 335. The total number of literates in Chhunche was 1,841 (82.41% of the population over 6 years).

References 

Villages in Chanditala I CD Block